The 2012 All-Pac-12 Conference football team consists of American football players chosen by various organizations for All-Pac-12 Conference teams for the 2012 Pac-12 Conference football season. The Stanford Cardinal won the conference, defeating the UCLA Bruins 27–24 in the Pac-12 Championship game. Stanford then beat the Big Ten champion Wisconsin Badgers in the Rose Bowl 20 to 14. USC wide receiver Marqise Lee was voted Pac-12 Offensive Player of the Year. Arizona State defensive tackle Will Sutton was voted Pat Tillman Pac-12 Defensive Player of the Year.

Offensive selections

Quarterbacks
Marcus Mariota, Oregon (1st)
Matt Scott, Arizona (2nd)

Running backs
Kenjon Barner, Oregon (1st)
Ka'Deem Carey, Arizona (1st)
Johnathan Franklin, UCLA (2nd)
Stepfan Taylor, Stanford (2nd)

Wide receivers
 Marqise Lee, USC (1st)
Markus Wheaton, Oregon St. (1st)
Austin Hill, Arizona (2nd)
Robert Woods, USC (2nd)

Tight ends
Zach Ertz, Stanford (1st)
Austin Seferian-Jenkins, Washington (2nd)

Tackles
David Bakhtiari, Colorado (2nd)

Guards
David Yankey, Stanford (1st)
Xavier Su'a-Filo, UCLA (1st)
Jeff Baca, UCLA (2nd)
Kevin Danser, Stanford (2nd)

Centers
Brian Schwenke, California (1st)
Hroniss Grasu, Oregon (1st)
Khaled Holmes, USC (1st)
Sam Brenner, Utah (2nd)
Sam Schwartzstein, Stanford (2nd)

Defensive selections

Ends
Scott Crichton, Oregon St. (1st)
Dion Jordan, Oregon (1st)
Datone Jones, UCLA (2nd)
Ben Gardner, Stanford (2nd)
Morgan Breslin, USC (2nd)
Henry Anderson, Stanford (2nd)

Tackles
Star Lotulelei, Utah (1st)
Will Sutton, Arizona St. (1st)

Linebackers
Anthony Barr, UCLA (1st)
Trent Murphy, Stanford (1st)
Chase Thomas, Stanford (1st)
Kiko Alonso, Oregon (2nd)
Michael Clay, Oregon (2nd)
Brandon Magee, Arizona St. (2nd)

Cornerbacks
Ifo Ekpre-Olomu, Oregon (1st)
Jordan Poyer, Oregon St. (1st)
Desmond Trufant, Washington (1st)
Alden Darby, Arizona St. (2nd)
Nickell Robey, USC (2nd)

Safeties
Ed Reynolds, Stanford (1st)
Deone Bucannon, Washington St. (2nd)
T. J. McDonald, USC (2nd)

Special teams

Placekickers
Vince D'Amato, California (1st)
Andrew Furney, Washington St. (2nd)

Punters
Jeff Locke, UCLA (1st)
Josh Hubner, Arizona St. (2nd)

Return specialists 
Reggie Dunn, Utah (1st)
Marqise Lee, USC (2nd)

Special teams player
Jordan Jenkins, Oregon St. (1st)
David Allen, UCLA (2nd)

Key

See also
2012 College Football All-America Team

References

All-Pac-12 Conference Football Team
All-Pac-12 Conference football teams